The Lithuanian Women's Basketball League (Lithuanian: Lietuvos Moterų Krepšinio Lyga) has seven teams.

History
Lietuvos telekomas/TEO/VIČI-Aistės have won the most championships, with 15.

2007–08 season teams 
 Kaunas „Aistės-Atletas“
 Marijampolė „Arvi“
 Panevėžys „Eglė“
 Kaunas „Laisvė“
 Klaipėda „Lemminkainen“
 Šiauliai „Rūta“
 Kaunas „TEO“
 Alytus „Alytus“

League champions 
 1989-90 Kibirkštis Vilnius
 1990-91 Kibirkštis Vilnius
 1991-92 Kibirkštis Vilnius
 1992-93 Kibirkštis Vilnius
 1993-94 LKKI Viktorija Kaunas
 1994-95 Lietuvos telekomas Vilnius
 1995-96 Lietuvos telekomas Vilnius
 1996-97 Laisvė Kaunas
 1997-98 Laisvė Kaunas
 1998-99 Laisvė Kaunas
 1999-00 Lietuvos telekomas Vilnius
 2000-01 Lietuvos telekomas Vilnius
 2001-02 Lietuvos telekomas Vilnius
 2002-03 Lietuvos telekomas Vilnius
 2003-04 Lietuvos telekomas Vilnius
 2004-05 Lietuvos telekomas Vilnius
 2005-06 Lietuvos telekomas Vilnius
 2006-07 TEO Vilnius (formerly Lietuvos telekomas)
 2007-08 TEO Vilnius
 2008-09 TEO Vilnius
 2009-10 TEO Vilnius
 2010-11 VIČI-Aistės Kaunas (formerly TEO Vilnius)
 2011-12 VIČI-Aistės Kaunas
 2012-13 Kibirkštis-VIČI Vilnius
 2013-14 Kibirkštis-VIČI Vilnius
 2014-15 BC Utena
 2015-16 Hoptrans-Sirenos Kauno rajonas
 2016-17 BC Sudūva Marijampolė
 2017-18 Hoptrans-Sirenos Kauno rajonas
 2018-19 Aistės-LSMU Kaunas

External links 
 Official league website

2002 establishments in Lithuania
Lithuania
Basketball leagues in Lithuania
Sports leagues established in 2002
Women's basketball in Lithuania
Professional sports leagues in Lithuania